Big Hollow may refer to:

 Big Hollow School District 38, in Illinois, United States, contains Big Hollow Primary, Elementary, and Middle School on one campus
 Big Hollow (Wisconsin), a valley in Sauk County
 The Big Hollow (Wyoming), Wind eroded depression in Wyoming in the United States
 Big Hollow is also the name of over 130 canyons and valleys in the United States.
 Big Chicken Hollow